Nil Ruiz Pascual (born 21 February 2003) is a Spanish  footballer who plays as a goalkeeper for Barcelona Atlètic.

Club career
Nil started his career as a goalkeeper at UE San Ildefons and then joined the youth system of CF Damm before signing with Barcelona Atlètic. In his final season in the U19 team with Damm, Ruiz was the best in the División d'Honor, winning the Zamora prize after putting together a run of 953 minutes of play without conceding a goal.

Career statistics

Club

References

External links
 
 
 
 FC Barcelona profile

2003 births
Living people
People from Barcelona
Spanish footballers
Association football goalkeepers
Primera Federación players
FC Barcelona Atlètic players